The 1935–36 season was Cardiff City F.C.'s 16th season in the Football League. They competed in the 22-team Division Three South, then the third tier of English football, finishing 20th.

Season review

Football League Third Division South

Partial league table

Results by round

Players
First team squad.

Fixtures and results

Third Division South

FA Cup

Welsh Cup

Third Division South Cup

Source

References

Bibliography

Cardiff City F.C. seasons
Association football clubs 1935–36 season
Card